The Philadelphia Register of Historic Places (PRHP) is a register of historic places by the Philadelphia Historical Commission. Buildings, structures, sites, objects, interiors and districts can be added to the list.

Criteria
According to the Philadelphia Historical Commission, sites eligible for listing are those that possess any of the following:
Has significant character, interest or value as part of the development, heritage or cultural characteristics of the city, commonwealth or nation, or is associated with the life of a person significant in the past.
Associated with an event of importance to the history of the city, commonwealth or nation.
Reflects the environment in an era characterized by a distinctive architectural style.
Embodies distinguishing characteristics of an architectural style or engineering specimen.
Is the work of a designer, architect, landscape architect or designer, or engineer whose work has significantly influenced the historical, architectural, economic, social, or cultural development of the city, commonwealth or nation.
Contains elements of design, detail, materials or craftsmanship which represent a significant innovation.
Is part of or related to a square, park or other distinctive area which should be preserved according to a historic, cultural or architectural motif.
Represents an established and familiar visual feature of the neighborhood, community or city.
Has yielded, or may be likely to yield, information important in pre-history or history.
Exemplifies the cultural, political, economic, social or historical heritage of the community.

Properties listed on the Philadelphia Register of Historic Places may also be recognized on the National Register of Historic Places, be listed as a National Historic Landmark, or listed as a contributing property in a National Historic District.

Philadelphia Historical Commission
The Philadelphia Historical Commission is the city agency responsible for overseeing the Philadelphia Register of Historic Places and ensuring the preservation of Philadelphia's historic resources including buildings, structures, sites, objects, interiors and districts.

Current listings

The lists below contain selected notable otable properties on the Philadelphia Register of Historic Places:

Properties listed in the register by name
Properties that do not have an official address as assigned by Philadelphia's Office of Property Assessment (OPA).

Properties listed in the register by address

The complete list contains over 11,000 sites.

Historic districts

Historic districts listed on the Philadelphia Register of Historic Places:

See also
List of National Historic Landmarks in Pennsylvania
National Register of Historic Places listings in Pennsylvania
National Register of Historic Places listings in Philadelphia, Pennsylvania

References

External links
 City of Philadelphia Historical Commission
 Philadelphia Register of Historic Places - Lists

 
History of Philadelphia